Robert Jakobi (born April 7, 1985) is a Food entrepreneur. He is the former Managing Director and Co Owner of Metcalfe's Food Company, which was founded by Julian Metcalfe in 2009.

Early life and education

Robert Jakobi grew up in London and then moved to the US to study. Jakobi attended Duke University, and then the University of Pennsylvania where he graduated in May 2007.

Career

Barclays Capital

Jakobi started his career as an Analyst in Investment Banking at Barclays Capital in New York.

Pod bites

In January 2010, whilst working in Finance, Jakobi founded a food company called Pod bites, which was a range of chocolate, and yoghurt covered edamame. He launched Pod bites in Harvey Nichols and Selfridges amongst others in March 2010.

Metcalfe’s Food Company

Through Pod bites Robert Jakobi met Julian Metcalfe who is the Co Founder of Itsu and Pret A Manger. Jakobi approached Julian as he was keen to get Pod bites into Itsu and Pret A Manger. Jakobi became the Managing Director of Metcalfe's Food Company in October 2010.

Metcalfe's Food Company enjoyed a compound annual growth rate of over 200% in revenues between 2011 and 2014. In February 2014 the company had forecast to achieve £50 Million in sales within the next 3 years. As of December 2014, Metcalfe's Food Company were the fastest-growing, privately owned food and drink company in the UK.

Metcalfe’s skinny

In January 2016 Diamond Foods acquired a minority stake in Metcalfe's skinny. The investment will help to maximise the growth potential of the brand in the UK and Europe.

In September 2016 the new owner of Kettle Foods Snyder's-Lance, Inc. acquired the remainder of the business.

BOU

In April 2017 Jakobi launched BOU, a range of better-for-you bouillon cubes into the US market. AccelFoods, an investment fund focused on food and beverage startups, are the lead investor.

Misfits Health

In August 2021 Jakobi led the Series A round of Misfits, a UK plant-based nutrition brand with a £3 Million investment. Misfits were ranked the 99th fastest growing business in Europe in the 2022 Financial Times 1000 list.

webloom

In March 2022 Jakobi launched webloom, a growth equity HoldCo to acquire emerging, better for you consumer brands. webloom will acquire UK companies to accelerate their growth in the US.

Awards

In December 2013, Metcalfe's Food Company were featured as one of ten ‘Ones to Watch’ in the Sunday Times Fast Track 100. The Fast Track 100 ranks the fastest growing privately owned companies in the UK.

In April 2014, Robert Jakobi along with Julian Metcalfe were named as London & South finalists for the 2014 Ernst & Young Entrepreneur of the Year Award. The award is considered one of the world's most prestigious business awards and is held in more than 145 cities and in more than 60 countries worldwide.

In May 2014, Metcalfe's Food Company were announced as one of the winners of The Santander Breakthrough 50 Awards. The awards celebrate the UK's top 50 most exciting fast-growth companies.

In July 2014, Robert was selected as one of 30 Young Guns. Young Guns celebrates annually the best 30 entrepreneurs aged 35 or under in the UK.

In December 2014, Metcalfe's Food Company were ranked at number 4 in the Sunday Times Fast Track 100.

In January 2015, Robert was selected on the Forbes 30 Under 30 in Food & Wine. In 2015 Forbes picked 600 people in 20 fields including Food & Wine.

Appearances

One Young World

On 16 October 2014, Robert was invited by One Young World as a special delegate to head a panel on successful young entrepreneurs at their annual summit in Dublin. The panel was chaired by Barclays CEO Anthony Jenkins and also included Hailo's Jay Bregman, made.com's Julien Callede, One Fine Stay's founder Tim Davey and YouTube celebrity Michelle Phan.

The summit brings together the generations’ most passionate young people to debate issues of universal concern.

Jakobi explained that the panel was to have a particular focus on the importance of inspiring youth entrepreneurship in an interview he did with Bloomberg prior to the summit.

References

1985 births
University of Pennsylvania alumni
Living people
Duke University alumni